Plutonium-239 (239Pu or Pu-239) is an isotope of plutonium. Plutonium-239 is the primary fissile isotope used for the production of nuclear weapons, although uranium-235 is also  used for that purpose. Plutonium-239 is also one of the three main isotopes demonstrated usable as fuel in thermal spectrum nuclear reactors, along with uranium-235 and uranium-233. Plutonium-239 has a half-life of 24,110 years.

Nuclear properties 
The nuclear properties of plutonium-239, as well as the ability to produce large amounts of nearly pure 239Pu more cheaply than highly enriched weapons-grade uranium-235, led to its use in nuclear weapons and nuclear power plants. The fissioning of an atom of uranium-235 in the reactor of a nuclear power plant produces two to three neutrons, and these neutrons can be absorbed by uranium-238 to produce plutonium-239 and other isotopes. Plutonium-239 can also absorb neutrons and fission along with the uranium-235 in a reactor.

Of all the common nuclear fuels, 239Pu has the smallest critical mass. A spherical untamped critical mass is about 11 kg (24.2 lbs), 10.2 cm (4") in diameter. Using appropriate triggers, neutron reflectors, implosion geometry and tampers, the critical mass can be less than half of that.

The fission of one atom of 239Pu generates 207.1 MeV = 3.318 × 10−11 J, i.e. 19.98 TJ/mol = 83.61 TJ/kg, or about 23 gigawatt hours/kg.

Production 
Plutonium is made from uranium-238. 239Pu is normally created in nuclear reactors by transmutation of individual atoms of one of the isotopes of uranium present in the fuel rods. Occasionally, when an atom of 238U is exposed to neutron radiation, its nucleus will capture a neutron, changing it to 239U. This happens more easily with lower kinetic energy (as 238U fission activation is 6.6MeV). The 239U then rapidly undergoes two β− decays — an emission of an electron and an anti-neutrino, leaving a proton — the first β− decay transforming the 239U into neptunium-239, and the second β− decay transforming the 239Np into 239Pu:

{}^{238}_{92}U + {}^{1}_{0}n -> {}^{239}_{92}U ->[\beta^-][23.5\ \ce{min}] {}^{239}_{93}Np ->[\beta^-][2.356\ \ce{d}] {}^{239}_{94}Pu

Fission activity is relatively rare, so even after significant exposure, the 239Pu is still mixed with a great deal of 238U (and possibly other isotopes of uranium), oxygen, other components of the original material, and fission products. Only if the fuel has been exposed for a few days in the reactor, can the 239Pu be chemically separated from the rest of the material to yield high-purity 239Pu metal.

239Pu has a higher probability for fission than 235U and a larger number of neutrons produced per fission event, so it has a smaller critical mass. Pure 239Pu also has a reasonably low rate of neutron emission due to spontaneous fission (10 fission/s·kg), making it feasible to assemble a mass that is highly supercritical before a detonation chain reaction begins.

In practice, however, reactor-bred plutonium will invariably contain a certain amount of 240Pu due to the tendency of 239Pu to absorb an additional neutron during production. 240Pu has a high rate of spontaneous fission events (415,000 fission/s-kg), making it an undesirable contaminant. As a result, plutonium containing a significant fraction of 240Pu is not well-suited to use in nuclear weapons; it emits neutron radiation, making handling more difficult, and its presence can lead to a "fizzle" in which a small explosion occurs, destroying the weapon but not causing fission of a significant fraction of the fuel. (However, in modern nuclear weapons using neutron generators for initiation and fusion boosting to supply extra neutrons, fizzling is not an issue.) It is because of this limitation that plutonium-based weapons must be implosion-type, rather than gun-type. Moreover, 239Pu and 240Pu cannot be chemically distinguished, so expensive and difficult isotope separation would be necessary to separate them. Weapons-grade plutonium is defined as containing no more than 7% 240Pu; this is achieved by only exposing 238U to neutron sources for short periods of time to minimize the 240Pu produced.

Plutonium is classified according to the percentage of the contaminant plutonium-240 that it contains:

 Supergrade 2–3%
 Weapons grade 3–7%
 Fuel grade 7–18%
 Reactor grade 18% or more

A nuclear reactor that is used to produce plutonium for weapons therefore generally has a means for exposing 238U to neutron radiation and for frequently replacing the irradiated 238U with new 238U. A reactor running on unenriched or moderately enriched uranium contains a great deal of 238U. However, most commercial nuclear power reactor designs require the entire reactor to shut down, often for weeks, in order to change the fuel elements. They therefore produce plutonium in a mix of isotopes that is not well-suited to weapon construction.  Such a reactor could have machinery added that would permit 238U slugs to be placed near the core and changed frequently, or it could be shut down frequently, so proliferation is a concern; for this reason, the International Atomic Energy Agency inspects licensed reactors often. A few commercial power reactor designs, such as the reaktor bolshoy moshchnosti kanalniy (RBMK) and pressurized heavy water reactor (PHWR), do permit refueling without shutdowns, and they may pose a proliferation risk. (In fact, the RBMK was built by the Soviet Union during the Cold War, so despite their ostensibly peaceful purpose, it is likely that plutonium production was a design criterion.) By contrast, the Canadian CANDU heavy-water moderated natural-uranium fueled reactor can also be refueled while operating, but it normally consumes most of the 239Pu it produces in situ;  thus, it is not only inherently less proliferative than most reactors, but can even be operated as an "actinide incinerator". The American IFR (Integral Fast Reactor) can also be operated in an "incineration mode", having some advantages in not accumulating the plutonium-242 isotope or the long-lived actinides, which cannot be easily burned except in a fast reactor. Also IFR fuel has a high proportion of burnable isotopes, while in CANDU an inert material is needed to dilute the fuel; this means the IFR can burn a higher fraction of its fuel before needing reprocessing. Most plutonium is produced in research reactors or plutonium production reactors called breeder reactors because they produce more plutonium than they consume fuel; in principle, such reactors make extremely efficient use of natural uranium.  In practice, their construction and operation is sufficiently difficult that they are generally only used to produce plutonium. Breeder reactors are generally (but not always) fast reactors, since fast neutrons are somewhat more efficient at plutonium production.

Plutonium-239 is more frequently used in nuclear weapons than uranium-235, as it is easier to obtain in a quantity of critical mass. Both plutonium-239 and uranium-235 are obtained from Natural uranium, which primarily consists of uranium-238 but contains traces of other isotopes of uranium such as uranium-235. The process of enriching uranium, i.e. increasing the ratio of 235U to 238U to weapons grade, is generally a more lengthy and costly process than the production of plutonium-239 from 238U and subsequent reprocessing.

Supergrade plutonium 
The "supergrade" fission fuel, which has less radioactivity, is used in the primary stage of US Navy nuclear weapons in place of the conventional plutonium used in the Air Force's versions. "Supergrade" is industry parlance for plutonium alloy bearing an exceptionally high fraction of 239Pu (>95%), leaving a very low amount of 240Pu, which is a high spontaneous fission isotope (see above). Such plutonium is produced from fuel rods that have been irradiated a very short time as measured in MW-day/ton burnup. Such low irradiation times limit the amount of additional neutron capture and therefore buildup of alternate isotope products such as 240Pu in the rod, and also by consequence is considerably more expensive to produce, needing far more rods irradiated and processed for a given amount of plutonium.

Plutonium-240, in addition to being a neutron emitter after fission, is a gamma emitter, and so is responsible for a large fraction of the radiation from stored nuclear weapons. Whether out on patrol or in port, submarine crew members routinely live and work in very close proximity to nuclear weapons stored in torpedo rooms and missile tubes, unlike Air Force missiles where exposures are relatively brief. The need to reduce radiation exposure justifies the additional costs of the premium supergrade alloy used on many naval nuclear weapons. Supergrade plutonium is used in W80 warheads.

In nuclear power reactors 
In any operating nuclear reactor containing 238U, some plutonium-239 will accumulate in the nuclear fuel. Unlike reactors used to produce weapons-grade plutonium, commercial nuclear power reactors typically operate at a high burnup that allows a significant amount of plutonium to build up in irradiated reactor fuel. Plutonium-239 will be present both in the reactor core during operation and in spent nuclear fuel that has been removed from the reactor at the end of the fuel assembly's service life (typically several years). Spent nuclear fuel commonly contains about 0.8% plutonium-239.

Plutonium-239 present in reactor fuel can absorb neutrons and fission just as uranium-235 can. Since plutonium-239 is constantly being created in the reactor core during operation, the use of plutonium-239 as nuclear fuel in power plants can occur without reprocessing of spent fuel; the plutonium-239 is fissioned in the same fuel rods in which it is produced. Fissioning of plutonium-239 provides more than one-third of the total energy produced in a typical commercial nuclear power plant. Reactor fuel would accumulate much more than 0.8% plutonium-239 during its service life if some plutonium-239 were not constantly being "burned off" by fissioning.

A small percentage of plutonium-239 can be deliberately added to fresh nuclear fuel. Such fuel is called MOX (mixed oxide) fuel, as it contains a mixture of uranium dioxide (UO2) and plutonium dioxide (PuO2). The addition of plutonium-239 reduces the need to enrich the uranium in the fuel.

Hazards 
Plutonium-239 emits alpha particles to become uranium-235. As an alpha emitter, plutonium-239 is not particularly dangerous as an external radiation source, but if it is ingested or breathed in as dust it is very dangerous and carcinogenic. It has been estimated that a pound (454 grams) of plutonium inhaled as plutonium oxide dust could give cancer to two million people. However, ingested plutonium is by far less dangerous as only a tiny fraction is absorbed in gastrointestinal tract. 800 mg would be unlikely to cause a major health risk as far as radiation is concerned. As a heavy metal, plutonium is also chemically toxic. See also Plutonium#Precautions.

Weapons grade plutonium (with greater than 90% 239Pu) is used to make nuclear weapons and has many advantages over other fissile material for that purpose. Lower proportions of 239Pu would make a reliable weapon design difficult or impossible; this is due to the spontaneous fission (and thus neutron production) of the undesirable 240Pu.

See also 
 Teller-Ulam design

References

External links 
 NLM Hazardous Substances Databank – Plutonium, Radioactive
 Table of nuclides with 239Pu data at Kaye and Laby Online
 Half-life of Plutonium-239 

Actinides
Fissile materials
Isotopes of plutonium
Special nuclear materials
Radioactive contamination